The 2008 St Helens R.F.C. season was the 136th in the club's history. They competed in Super League XIII as well as the 2008 Challenge Cup tournament.

2008 Fixtures/Results

References

St Helens R.F.C. seasons
St Helens RLFC season